George L. Siegel (August 21, 1885 – January 23, 1963) was an American lawyer and politician.

Siegel was born in Saint Paul, Minnesota and went to the Saint Paul public schools. He received his law degree from St. Paul College of Law (William Mitchell College of Law) in 1911 and practiced law in Saint Paul, Minnesota. Siegel served in the Minnesota House of Representatives from 1917 to 1920 and in the Minnesota Senate from 1931 to 1954.

References

1885 births
1963 deaths
Politicians from Saint Paul, Minnesota
Minnesota lawyers
William Mitchell College of Law alumni
Members of the Minnesota House of Representatives
Minnesota state senators